Jean Lavertue (born September 4, 1974 in Montreal, Quebec) is a Canadian male weightlifter, competing in the 85 kg category and representing Canada at international competitions. He participated at the 1996 Summer Olympics in the 64 kg event. He competed at world championships, most recently at the 2006 World Weightlifting Championships.

Major results

References

External links
 

1974 births
Living people
Canadian male weightlifters
Weightlifters at the 1996 Summer Olympics
Olympic weightlifters of Canada
Sportspeople from Montreal
20th-century Canadian people
21st-century Canadian people